Messier 46 or M46, also known as NGC 2437, is an open cluster of stars in the slightly southern constellation of Puppis. It was discovered by Charles Messier in 1771. Dreyer described it as "very bright, very rich, very large." It is about 5,000 light-years away.

It has a greater spatial extent in infrared than in visible light, suggesting it is undergoing some mass segregation with the fainter (redder) stars migrating to a coma (tail) region. The fainter stars that extend out to the south and west may form a tidal tail due to a past interaction.

The planetary nebula NGC 2438 appears to lie within the cluster near its northern edge (the faint almost rainbow array of colored smudge at the top-center of the image), but it is most likely unrelated since it does not share the cluster's radial velocity. This makes for superimposed objects of interest, another instance perhaps being NGC 2818.
On the other hand, the illuminating star of the bipolar Calabash Nebula shares the radial velocity and proper motion of Messier 46, and is at the same distance, so is a bona fide member of the open cluster.

M46 is located close by to another open cluster, Messier 47. M46 is about a degree east of M47 in the sky, so the two fit well in a binocular or wide-angle telescope field.

See also
 List of Messier objects
Messier object

References

External links

 Messier 46, SEDS Messier pages
 Messier 46, Amateur Astronomer Image – Waid Obseratory
 Dark Atmospheres Photography – M46 w/ NGC 2438 detail

 – featuring M46

 

Messier 046
Orion–Cygnus Arm
Messier 046
046
Messier 046
17710219